Variations for piano, Op. 27, is a twelve-tone piece for piano composed by Anton Webern in 1936. It consists of three movements:

Webern's only published work for solo piano, the Variations are one of his major instrumental works and a signal example of his late style. Webern dedicated the work to pianist Eduard Steuermann. However, it was premiered (after months of coaching from Webern) by Peter Stadlen on 26 October 1937 in Vienna. Much later Stadlen produced the definitive interpretive edition of Op. 27, published by Universal Edition in 1979.

History of composition
By the early 1930s, Webern was one of the composers and artists criticised by the Nazi Party, which was rapidly gaining power. By 1934, Webern's conducting career, a major source of income for the composer, was practically over, and he earned his living by teaching composition to a few private pupils. Despite the considerable disadvantages this financial situation had, the lack of a stable job provided Webern with more time to compose.

Opus 27 took Webern about a year to complete. The three movements were not composed in the order they appear in the work:
 Third movement: begun 14 October 1935, completed 8 July 1936
 First movement: begun 22 July 1936, completed 19 August 1936
 Second movement: begun 25 August 1936, completed 5 November 1936
The piece is the only work for piano solo that was published by the composer and assigned an opus number. It was also the last work by Webern to be published by Universal Edition during his lifetime.

Analysis

Structure
All three movements of the work are 12-tone pieces based on the following row (as found at the beginning of the second movement):

The work's title, Variations, is ambiguous. In a letter dated 18 July, Webern wrote: "The completed part is a variations movement; the whole will be a kind of 'Suite'". Only the third movement was completed at the time, and it is clearly a set of variations. The form of the other two movements conforms to the "Suite" plan: the first movement is a ternary form, A–B–A, and the second is a binary form. However, to refer to an entire work by the form of its last movement is very unusual, and numerous attempts have been made to explain the title.

Webern scholar Kathryn Bailey outlined three possible views on the structure of the piece. Webern's Variations may be considered any of these:
 A three-movement sonata: sonata form – binary scherzo – variations
 A three-movement suite: ternary movement – binary movement – variations
 A set of variations, in which the first two movements have little connection to the third

One of the earliest explanations was offered by René Leibowitz, who in 1948 described the first movement as a theme and two variations, the second movement as a theme with a single variation, and the third movement as five variations of yet another theme. Willi Reich, a member of Arnold Schoenberg's circle, described the work as a sonatina which begins with a set of variations (first movement) and ends with a sonata form (third movement). Reich claimed his explanation was identical to Webern's and stemmed from the two men's conversations, however, the authenticity of this claim has been questioned.

Yet another explanation was provided by Friedhelm Döhl (who published Reich's analysis, but did not find it satisfactory), who viewed each of the fourteen phrases in the first movement as a variation of the prime/retrograde idea, and found the same structure in the second movement. Robert U. Nelson published a similar analysis in 1969. Finally, Kathryn Bailey's analysis suggests that the first movement is a sonata form, her ideas supported by Webern's own remarks in the original manuscript, published in 1979 by Peter Stadlen.

Symmetry
A particularly notable feature of Variations is symmetry, which is featured throughout the work. Horizontal symmetry can be observed, for example, in successive phrases of the first movement: bars 1–18 comprise four phrases, each built from the normal row and its retrograde stated simultaneously, and the second half of the phrase is always a reverse of the first. Each phrase is therefore a palindrome, though only the first pair of rows in the beginning of the movement is perfectly palindromic. Vertical symmetry pervades the second movement, which is a canon. The pitches are arranged around the pitch axis of A4. Each downward reaching interval is replicated exactly in the opposite direction.

Notes

Sources
  Paperback reprint 2006. .
 
 
  Translation of Muziek van de twintigste eeuw: een onderzoek naar haar elementen en structuur. Utrecht: Oosthoek, 1964. Third impression, Utrecht: Bohn, Scheltema & Holkema, 1977. .

Further reading
 Bailey, Kathryn. Juni 1988. "Willi Reich's Webern". Tempo, New Series, no. 165, Emigres and 'Internal Exiles', pp. 18–22.
 Fiori, Mary E. 1970. "Webern's Use of Motive in the 'Piano Variations'". In: Lincoln, Harry B. (ed.). The Computer and Music, pp. 115–122. Ithaca: Cornell University Press.
 Jones, James Rives. Autumn–Winter 1968. "Some Aspects of Rhythm and Meter in Webern's Opus 27". Perspectives of New Music, vol. 7, no. 1, pp. 103–109.
 Leleu, Jean-Louis. 1998. "Intuition et esprit de système. Réflexions sur le schéma formel du deuxième mouvement des Variations pour piano op. 27 de Webern". Revue belge de Musicologie / Belgisch Tijdschrift voor Muziekwetenschap, vol. 52, pp. 101–122.
 Lewin, David. October 1993. "A Metrical Problem in Webern's Op. 27". Music Analysis, vol. 12, no. 3, pp. 343–354.
 Moldenhauer, Hans, and Rosaleen Moldenhauer. 1978. Anton von Webern: A Chronicle of His Life and Work. New York: Alfred A. Knopf. . London: Gollancz. 
 Ogden, Wilbur. Spring 1962. "A Webern Analysis". Journal of Music Theory, vol. 6, no. 1, pp. 133–135.
 Stockhausen, Karlheinz. 1963. "Gruppenkomposition: Klavierstück I (Anleitung zum Hören)". In his Texte zur Musik, vol. 1, edited by Dieter Schnebel, 63–74. DuMont Dokumente. Cologne: Verlag M. DuMont Schauberg.
 Travis, Roy. Spring–Summer 1966. "Directed Motion in Two Brief Piano Pieces by Schoenberg and Webern". Perspectives of New Music 4.2, pp. 85–89.
 Westergaard, Peter. Spring 1963. "Webern and 'Total Organization': an analysis of the Second Movement of Piano Variations, op. 27". Perspectives of New Music 1.2, pp. 107–120.

External links
A Metrical Analysis and Re-notation of Webern's Variations for Piano, 1st movement, Joseph L. Monzo 2010, tonalsoft.com
Performance of Variations for Piano by Jonathan Biss from the Isabella Stewart Gardner Museum in MP3 format

Compositions by Anton Webern
Compositions for solo piano
Twelve-tone compositions
Variations
1936 compositions
Music dedicated to ensembles or performers